The Heroon at Nemea is a part of the larger Panhellenic sanctuary of Zeus in the North-West Argolid.  A small feature of the sanctuary as a whole, the heroon is a large mound of earth situated on the west side of the Nemea river. This site is dedicated to the mythological hero Opheltes, an infant whose death was foretold by the seer Amphiaraus.   Though little remains of the activities of the heroon, it is suspected that the athletic games which took place there were the predecessor of the Nemean Games, though this does contrast with the idea that Herakles created the games. Evidence of cult activities and the practicing of magic at the heroon have also been found.

The Heroon 

The heroon was likely at the height of its use from the 6th century BCE to the 4th century BCE, but little remains from its earliest stages. Later construction of a five-sided peribolos wall and a general flattening of the mound have also altered the structure.

The immediate surroundings of the heroon include an unlined well, a three-part reservoir, evidence of a hippodrome, remains of an athletic track, and the starting line of the early stadium. Many of these structures may have been built for use during the athletic events held in honor of the hero Opheltes.

The first Nemean Games were held in 573 BCE and the heroon was constructed around the same time, however sources for the myth of Opheltes are traceable only to the early 5th century BCE. Therefore, it is likely the heroon predates the hero that it commemorates. In the mid third century BCE, when the games were relocated to Argos the shrine fell out of use.

The Cult of Opheltes 

According to legend, Opheltes was the infant son of King Lycurus and his wife Eurydice of Nemea. His nurse was Hypsipyle, the former queen of the island of Lemnos who had been taken as a slave. Lycurus and Eurydice had been told by the seer Amphiaraus that their son could not be put down on the ground until he had learned to walk or else he would be killed, and the couple passed this directive onto the nurse. However, when the Seven against Thebes, on their way from Argos to Thebes, stopped at Nemea, they asked Hypsipyle to show them to water. Obliging, Hypsipyle set down Opheltes in a bed of wild celery within a sacred space and led the men away. In her absence, a snake – the protector of the space – strangled the child.

Opheltes posthumously received the name Archemorus which combines the words archí meaning "old" and morós, or "fate, destruction, or death" to form the epithet “forerunner of death” or "beginning of doom". Additionally, funeral celebrations and athletic events – perhaps the Neman Games – were arranged by the Seven in the late baby's honor and he was elevated to the status of hero. Crowns of wild celery were given to the victors at the Nemean Games, supposedly in Ophletes’ honor, and the celery stood as a symbol of sadness for the child.

Artifacts recovered 

Not much pottery has been excavated from the heroon save several examples of whole vessels deliberately arranged and buried.  However, a series of tablets engraved with what appear to be erotic curses have been found at the site. These tablets, seven in total and four with discernible curses written on them, serve as an acknowledgement of the cult activities that took place at the heroon; since Opheltes died a violent death at a very young age his shrine is desirable place for Greeks to practice magic, through the typical hero shrine wouldn't be.

The tablets were found scattered across the heroon but each was made in the same fashion, by folding and nailing shut a sheet of lead with an inscription on its surface. The binding spells written on these tablets call for an individual to be "turn[ed] away" from their lover for the benefit of the person creating the curse. The person creating the tablet invokes different parts of their enemy's body and spirit to establish walls between them and their lover through as many facets as possible.

Since the writing on the tablets is done in cursive and features letters which are not documented until the 4th century BCE or later, it is likely that the curse tablets were left at the heroon after the site fell out of use. The differing styles of handwriting on the tablets indicates that each was deposited by a different individual.

References

Ancient Greek sanctuaries in Greece
6th-century BC religious buildings and structures
4th-century BC religious buildings and structures
Ancient Greek buildings and structures
Temples of Zeus
Nemea